Charles Robert Dennison (12 September 1932 – 9 July 2017) was an English professional footballer who made 24 appearances in the Football League playing as a right back for Hull City. He also played non-league football for Scarborough of the Midland League.

References

1932 births
2017 deaths
Footballers from Kingston upon Hull
English footballers
Association football fullbacks
Hull City A.F.C. players
Scarborough F.C. players
English Football League players
Midland Football League players